The 2022–23 Howard Bison men's basketball team represented Howard University in the 2022–23 NCAA Division I men's basketball season. The Bison, led by fourth-year head coach Kenny Blakeney, played their home games at Burr Gymnasium in Washington, D.C. as members of the Mid-Eastern Athletic Conference.  They finished the season 19–12, 11–3 in MEAC play to finish in first place. As the No. 1 seed, they defeated South Carolina State, Maryland Eastern Shore, and Norfolk State to win the MEAC tournament. They received the conference’s automatic bid to the NCAA tournament, Howard's first appearance in the tournament since 1992. As the No. 16 seed in the West Region, they were defeated by No. 1 seed Kansas in the First Round.

Previous season
The Bison finished the 2021–22 season 16–12, 9–5 in MEAC play to finish in second place. As the No. 2 seed, they were upset by No. 7 seed Coppin State in the quarterfinals of the MEAC tournament.

Roster

Schedule and results

|-
!colspan=12 style=| Exhibition

|-
!colspan=12 style=| Regular season

|-
!colspan=9 style=| MEAC tournament

|-
!colspan=12 style=}| NCAA tournament

Sources

References

Howard Bison men's basketball seasons
Howard Bison
Howard Bison men's basketball
Howard Bison men's basketball
Howard